Vladimir Grigoryevich Kulakov (born April 23, 1944 in Komsomolsk-on-Amur, Khabarovsk Krai, Russian SFSR) was the 5th Governor of Voronezh Oblast in Russia from 2000 to 2009. He sees  himself in favour of strengthening of intelligence agencies.  He became governor on December 24, 2000 and was re-elected on March 14, 2004.  On February 16, 2009 his term ending on March 12 was not prolonged by Dmitry Medvedev.

References

1944 births
Living people
People from Komsomolsk-on-Amur
KGB officers
Governors of Voronezh Oblast
Members of the Federation Council of Russia (after 2000)